The northern little yellow-eared bat (Vampyressa thyone) is a bat species found from southern Mexico to Bolivia, the Guianas and western Brazil.

References

Vampyressa
Bats of Central America
Bats of South America
Bats of Brazil
Bats of Mexico
Mammals of Bolivia
Mammals of French Guiana
Mammals of Guyana
Mammals of Peru
Mammals of Venezuela
Mammals described in 1909
Taxa named by Oldfield Thomas